The WAFF Women's Clubs Championship is an international women's association football competition. It involves club teams from countries affiliated with the West Asian governing body WAFF. The competition was first played in 2019, with five teams participating at the time. Safa are the current champions, having won the 2022 edition.

Records and statistics

Performances by club

Performances by nation

All-time scorers

See also
FIFA Women's Club World Cup
AFC Women's Club Championship
WAFF Women's Clubs Championship
CAF Women's Champions League
Copa Libertadores Femenina
UEFA Women's Champions League
International competitions in women's association football

References

External links

 
Women
Women's association football competitions in Asia
Recurring sporting events established in 2019
2019 establishments in Asia